As a result of the AM-FM migration in Mexico, two radio stations currently bear the XHQT-FM callsign:

XHQT-FM (Sonora), 102.7 FM "Exa FM" in Nogales, Sonora
XHQT-FM (Veracruz), 106.9 FM "La Poderosa" in Veracruz, Veracruz